Boomershoot is a long range precision rifle event held near Orofino, Idaho, each year in late spring. Shooters are allowed to engage as many targets as they are able during the all-day event. In 2019, over a ton of explosives were mixed on site and used in the three day event. Individual shooters have an opportunity to shoot personal fireballs on Friday evening. A "High Intensity Event" features hundreds of targets about 25 yards away which disappear in a thunderous cloud of smoke, dust, and sometimes mud in a matter of a few minutes. A huge, explosive fireball less than 100 feet from the spectators opens the long range event on Sunday.

Targets
The smallest and closest targets are  square boxes, about the size and thickness of a common brown rodent poison container, with more immediate results if a rodent ventures near it during this event. The farthest targets are shot with higher power guns including .50 cal shooters from what is referred to as the ".50 Caliber Ghetto" at the lower/eastern end of the firing line.

Popularity
The Boomershoot has appeared in magazines such as Newsweek and Outside Magazine, KING 5 Evening Magazine, Shooting Gallery TV show, as well as numerous articles in local newspapers.

A centerfire rifle capable of delivering accuracy of at least one minute of angle with velocity at the target of at least  is required to reliably detonate the targets.

On the two days prior to the main event a precision rifle clinic is held at the same location using steel as well as exploding targets.

References

Shooting competitions in the United States
Tourist attractions in Clearwater County, Idaho
Sports in Idaho
Sports competitions in Idaho